Sheshtaraz Rural District is a rural district (dehestan) in Sheshtaraz District, Khalilabad County, Razavi Khorasan province, Iran. At the 2006 census, its population was 6,352, in 1,775 families.  The rural district has 6 villages.

References 

Rural Districts of Razavi Khorasan Province
Khalilabad County